John Mordechai Gottman (born April 26, 1942) is an American psychologist, professor emeritus of psychology at the University of Washington. His work focuses on divorce prediction and marital stability through relationship analyses. The lessons derived from this work represent a partial basis for the relationship counseling movement that aims to improve relationship functioning and the avoidance of those behaviors shown by Gottman and other researchers to harm human relationships. His work has also had a major impact on the development of important concepts on social sequence analysis. He and his wife, psychologist Julie Schwartz Gottman, co-founded and lead a relationship company and therapist training entity called The Gottman Institute. They have also co-founded Affective Software Inc, a program designed to make marriage and relationship counseling methods and resources available to a larger audience.

Gottman was recognized in 2007 as one of the 10 most influential therapists of the past twenty-five years.

Personal life 
John Gottman was born on April 26, 1942, in the Dominican Republic to Orthodox Jewish parents. His father was a rabbi in pre-World War II Vienna. Gottman was educated in a Lubavitch yeshiva elementary school in Brooklyn. He keeps kosher (follows Jewish dietary laws) and observes Shabbat, a day dedicated to religious worship and rest.

Over three decades ago, he married Julie Gottman née Schwartz, a psychotherapist. His two previous marriages had ended in divorce. He has a daughter named Moriah Gottman.

John and Julie Gottman currently live in Washington state.

Education and work experience 
John Gottman received his bachelor's degree in Mathematics-Physics from Fairleigh Dickinson University in 1962. In 1964, Gottman earned his master's in Mathematics-Psychology from the Massachusetts Institute of Technology. He received an M.A. in Clinical Psychology-Mathematics in 1967 and his Ph.D. in Clinical Psychology in 1971 from the University of Wisconsin.

At Fairleigh Dickinson University, Gottman worked as an instructor for the mathematics department, a research assistant for the department of physics, and a researcher for the school of engineering. At the Lawrence Radiation Laboratory, he worked as a computer programmer and mathematician. He was a program evaluator and research designer for the Wisconsin Department of Public Instruction. 1981, Gottman became a professor of psychology at the University of Illinois. Additionally, he was professor of psychology at the University of Washington, Seattle for 16 years. From 2002 until today, Gottman works as the Emeritus Professor of Psychology for the University of Washington and as the executive director for the Relationship Research Institute in Seattle. Alongside his wife, he is also the co-founder of The Gottman Institute.

Studies

Predictions of divorce 

Gottman developed multiple models, scales, and formulas to predict marital stability and divorce in couples. He has completed seven studies in this field.  Some of Gottman's most popular work comes from his research regarding newlywed couples.

This work concludes that there are four negative behaviors that are most likely to lead to and therefore predict divorce. These are: criticism of a partner's personality; contempt, which is usually derived from a position of superiority; defensiveness; and stonewalling, which is displayed through emotional withdrawal from interactions. Typically, these are actions made as a result of feeling overwhelmed by criticism coming at them from their partner.

Stable couples handle conflict in gentle, positive ways and are supportive of each other. In Gottman's book Seven Principles for Making Marriage Work he addresses some standard tools that these couples implement to stay together, from taking the time to continue building a friendship with their spouse, to honoring and respecting their spouse.

He developed "The Gottman Method Couple's Therapy" based on his research findings. The form of therapy aims to increase respect, affection, and closeness; break through and resolve conflict; generate greater understandings; and keep conflict discussions calm.  The goal of The Gottman Method is to help couples build happy and stable marriages. Gottman's therapy model focuses more on the process of conflict within the marriage, and less on the content of the conflict.

John Gottman conducted a study based on oral interviews with 95 newlywed couples. His predictions are based on perceived marital bonds. Couples were asked about their relationship, mutual history, and philosophy toward marriage. The interview measured the couple's perceptions of shared history and marriage by focusing on the positive or negative qualities of the relationship expressed in the telling of the story. To measure each spouse's perception of the marriage and each other, the interviewer listened to the couple's negative or positive experiences. Rather than scoring the content of their answers, interviewers used the Oral History Interview coding system, developed by Buehlman and Gottman in 1996, to measure spouses' perceptions about the marriage and each other. Therefore, the couples' perception was used to predict whether they would gain marital stability or end up divorced. The more positive their perceptions and attitudes were about their marriage and each other, the more stable the marriage.

John Gottman's models partly rely on Paul Ekman's method of analyzing human emotion and microexpressions.  Ekman's research was primarily based on observing the micro-expressions to determine whether somebody was lying or telling the truth.

The original study was published by Gottman and Christopher Buehlman in 1992, in which they interviewed couples with children. A posteriori modeling yielded a discriminant function that could discern those who had divorced with 94% accuracy. Since Gottman believed that early married life is a period of adjustment, and perceptions are being formed, he sought to predict marital stability and divorce through couples' perceptions during the first year of marriage.

In 1998, Gottman developed a model to predict which newlywed couples would remain married and which would divorce four to six years later. The model fits the data with 90% accuracy. Another model from Gottman can determine with 81% accuracy which marriages survived after seven to nine years.

Gottman's follow-up study with newlywed couples, published in 2000, used the Oral History Interview to predict marital stability and divorce. Gottman's model fit with 87.4% accuracy for classifying couples who divorce (or not) within the couples' first five years of marriage. He used couples' perceptions about their marriages and each other to model marital stability or divorce.

In a 2002 paper, Gottman and Robert W. Levenson perform a regression analysis of a two-factor model where skin conductance levels and oral history narratives encodings are the only two statistically significant variables. Facial expressions using Ekman's encoding scheme were not statistically significant.

Gottman developed what he named "The Four Horsemen": 1. Criticism, 2. Defensiveness, 3. Contempt, and 4. Stonewalling, as ineffective communication styles that contribute to marital dissolution. Gottman claims that one of the highest predictors of divorce was the presence of contempt, which he defined a spouse viewing themselves as better than the other spouse.

Independent studies testing Gottman marriage courses

Building Strong Families Program

Independent research on the impact of Gottman's marriage strengthening programs for the general public has further questioned Gottman couple education programs.

The largest independent evaluation of a marriage education curriculum developed by Gottman was conducted by Mathematica Policy Research at nine sites in five states. The study was titled, "Loving Couples, Loving Children," and was a federally funded, multi-year Building Strong Families Program study contracted by the U.S. Department of Health and Human Services, Administration for Children and Families. The study group included low-income, unwed couples.

An impact report released by the Office of Planning Research and Evaluation showed that the intervention had no positive impact and, in one case, "had negative effects on couples' relationships."

Supporting Healthy Marriage Project

An ongoing study by Manpower Development Research Corporation (MDRC), known as the Supporting Healthy Marriage Project (SHM), is evaluating Gottman's "Loving Couples, Loving Children" program among low-income, married couples. The multi-year, random assignment study is funded by the U.S. Department of Health and Human Services, Administration for Children and Families. In an early impact study on the effectiveness of "skills-based relationship education programs designed to help low-income married couples strengthen their relationships and, in turn, to support more stable and more nurturing home environments and more positive outcomes for parents and their children," MDRC reported "Overall, the program has shown some small positive effects, without clear indications (yet no clear negative proof) for improving the odds to stay together after 12 months."

The program is still ongoing.

Matthews, Wickrama and Conger 

A study published by Matthews, Wickrama and Conger, based on couples' perceptions, was done in 1996. The study showed that spousal hostility and net of warmth predicted, with 80% accuracy, which couples would divorce or not divorce within a year.

Relations and effects

In multiple analyses, Gottman has shown a plethora of relations and effects in marriage and divorce, some in peer-reviewed publications, while many others appear in Gottman's own books. Among those are:
 The physical elements in marital conflict (i.e., physical effects are central to the inability to think, etc., in conflict situations) for which he advises a 20-minute cooling period or physical relaxation.
 The effects of "bids for connection." That is the smallest bids people do to connect and how the other reacts. For example, happy couples do have many more "bids for connection" when together, and much more "turn towards" response, and much, much fewer "turn away" - the most negative reaction. The book dedicated to this element is "The Relationship Cure."
 The concept of "trust," which Gottman defines as having each other's backs. He explains that some ways this can be achieved for couples are through "creating shared meaning, making life dreams come true, managing conflict, using a positive perspective, turning towards each other rather than away...sharing fondness and admiration", and continuing to get to know the other.
 The neutral effect provides a way out of negative interactions as most interactions do not transition directly from negative to positive. The degree of neutral effect is often overlooked as a predictor of relationship success due to the very fact that the neutral effect is simply neutral.
 The dynamic to cause divorce in the short term is different from that causing divorce later. Early divorce is characterized by the "four horsemen" of bad fighting, whereas later divorce is characterized by lower positive affect in earlier stages of the relationship.
 Anger is not always bad for relationships. Happy couples are as frequently angry as unhappy couples. It seems that how people react to anger and how destructive they get is the crucial factor rather than the frequency of anger or fights. Gottman even says that anger is functional in marriage. The reason for anger being functional is because there is a reason behind the anger. Gottman describes anger like this as an iceberg where the raw feelings cannot be seen. Anger is what is emerging from these raw emotions.
The "three functional styles of conflict management in couples' relationships" (Avoidant, validating, and volatile) as well as the dysfunctional style he refers to as hostile.
 69% of happy couples still have *the very same* unresolved conflicts after 10 years, yet remain happy because they do not get gridlocked in the conflict and manage to get around it. When Gottman refers to gridlock, he is describing the "rigid patterns" that couples can get stuck in when dealing with conflict.

Cascade Model of Relational Dissolution

Gottman's Cascade Model of Relational Dissolution states that there are four major emotional reactions that are destructive and thus are the four predictors to a divorce: criticism, defensiveness, stonewalling, and contempt. Gottman calls these four predictors of divorce the “four horsemen” of marriage because they herald trouble for a marriage. They are a part of the Cascade Model of Relational Dissolution because they build upon each other. One behavior leads to the next, resulting in more hostility and less communication in a relationship, ultimately, leading to emotional separation and dissolution of the marriage.

Criticism

The first indication of the cascade model is criticism. Criticism is an attack on a person's character or personality. One way to differentiate between a criticism and a complaint is in the way the statement begins. Relationships that tend to stay together begin conversations like these in what Gottman describes as a soft startup, or a tactful, respectful way of speaking, rather than in a harsh startup, which typically incorporates broad absolute statements such as “you always…” or “you never…” Couples whose relationship tends to be more negative engage in criticism of one another more frequently. Frequent critiques and attacks relating to this tier can lead to other behaviors that are set out in the cascade model.

Defensiveness

Defensiveness, the second tier of the cascade model is a response to pathological criticism. A partner in this phase will attempt to make excuses or even shift blame from themselves to their partner. This phase of the cascade model can also cause their partner to feel that they are not taking their concerns seriously or that they are avoiding responsibility. This is characterized by a deflection of criticism and an avoidance of responsibility. Counter attacks and criticism of one's partner are characteristic of defensiveness.

Contempt

The third tier of the cascade model is contempt which is derived from a mentality of superiority. Pathological criticism of one another and responding to this criticism with defensive behaviors can lead to contempt. Contempt results from a lack of respect or acknowledgement. Contempt may include sarcasm, cynicism, name calling, eye rolling, mockery, or hostile humor. A general indignation and lack of respect characterizes interaction in this phase of the cascade.

Stonewalling

Stonewalling is the final tier of the cascade model and is a response to the first three tiers. It is characterized by the building up of mental and physical barriers to avoid interaction with one's partner. An attempt to appear busy or other means of purposely avoiding contact are employed and very little communication takes place. Communication that does take place is not meaningful and can often be destructive. This often occurs when an individual feels overwhelmed, and it is strongly related to the experience of emotional flooding.

Flooding

Emotional flooding occurs when a person feels inundated with sudden negative emotions and behaviors (often the first three predictors in this model,) and it leads them to promptly end or avoid further interaction with their partner. This experience can diminish their ability to communicate effectively, and it may compel them to stonewall or exhibit other avoidant behaviors. Although flooding is not one of the main four indicators of divorce, Gottman indicated that it was an important factor in this model. His research also noted that there are gender differences related to flooding; specifically that it is a more common experience for men. It has also been linked to an increase chance of intimate partner violence, possibly due to the decreased capacity for appropriate cognitive functioning and the inability to cope with conflict that is indicative of flooding.

The Seven Principles for Making Marriage Work

In The Seven Principles for Making Marriage Work, his most popular book, Gottman discusses behaviors that he observed in marriages that are successful and those that are detrimental to marriage, based on research conducted at his "Love Lab" in Seattle, Washington. He outlines seven principles that will reinforce the positive aspects of a relationship and help marriages endure during the rough moments. These principles include, enhancing your love map (a term Gottman uses to describe the center of a person's brain where they store relevant information about their partner), nurturing your fondness and admiration, turning towards each other rather than away, letting your partner influence you, solving solvable problems, overcoming gridlock, and creating a shared meaning.

Practical solutions

The following is a partial list of methods and practices developed by Gottman and his wife for marriage and child-rearing:

Therapist education
The Gottman Institute certifies new therapists regularly. Three levels of professional training are generally delivered through intensive two-day seminars or through at-home or online study to train therapists in Gottman Method Couples Therapy:

 Learn to integrate research-based methods and inspire transformation in your work with couples.
 Identify the communication patterns, friendship basis, and conflict management dynamics that characterize enduring intimate relationships.
 Discover a roadmap for helping couples to compassionately manage their conflicts, deepen their friendship and intimacy, and share their life purpose and dreams.
In Gottman's book, The Marriage Clinic: A Scientifically-Based Marital Therapy, he states that therapy should emphasize "conflict regulation, not resolution."

Pre-birth workshop
Bringing Baby Home is a two-day seminar to help prepare would-be parents to a new baby, using 18 exercises and other tricks. 

In a peer-reviewed paper, Gottman shows that for a randomly controlled, unblinded experiment, couples attending the workshop were better off later, as follows: Without the workshop, 70% of couples had lower marital satisfaction relative to before birth (a common finding); 58% of mothers had some symptoms of depression after giving birth. For mothers who participated in the workshop, only 22% had depressive symptoms.

Self-help books
Gottman has authored or co-authored 60 works. They cover research-backed advice for improving marriages, raising emotionally intelligent children, and on having children without damaging the relationship.

In Gottman's work, Raising an Emotionally Intelligent Child, he lists the five steps to emotion coaching. Emotion coaching is designed to "support the development of empathetic responses and thought constructions promoting better self-management and regulation." The five steps Gottman lists in his book are:
Be aware of your child's emotions.
Recognize the emotion as an opportunity for connection and teaching.
Listening empathetically and validating your child's emotions.
Help your child label their emotions.
Set limits while problem solving.

His most famous self-help book, The Seven Principles for Making Marriage Work: A Practical Guide from the Country's Foremost Relationship Expert, is widely regarded as both powerful and practical.

The Gottman Method of Relationship Therapy 
The Gottman Method is a therapy approach which focuses on supporting and strengthening couples by utilizing Gottman's research and his theory which is referred to as The Sound Relationship House. This theory consists of nine components.

 Building love maps - This refers to enhancing how well one knows their partner. Gottman developed an app especially designed to target the further developing love maps named Gottman's Card Decks. The app centers around asking questions in different relational areas such as emotional intimacy, romance, friendship, hobbies, and personality aspects of each partner. It is free to download and is often advertised on The Gottman Institute social media platforms. The questions are created in order to encourage couples to think deeply about what they already know about one another and spaces in which they can improve and continue learning new details about them or changes as they occur. The goal in mind when developing love maps is to strengthen bonds and increase fondness and admiration in the relationship.
 Nurturing fondness and admiration in the relationship. 
 Turning towards each other -  This involves being aware of a partner's needs and responding to their bids for connection.
 Creating a positive perspective -  This is when the couple looks for the best in each other rather than rushing to criticism.
 Managing conflict -  Managing conflict is when you take into consideration your partner's feelings and emotions.  Another aspect of conflict management is continual dialogue to ensure resolution.  When feeling heated during arguments, it is important to self-soothe by doing something to get your mind off the issue at hand.
 Making life dreams come true -  It is important to be with someone who is trying to inspire you to reach your goals.
 Creating shared meaning -  This is when couples start to have rituals, traditions, and symbols that you share together.
 Weight-bearing wall - Cultivating trust in the relationship.
 Weight-bearing wall - Cultivating commitment in the relationship.

Therapists can receive certification in Gottman Method Couples Therapy.

Awards and honors 
Gottman has been the recipient of four National Institute of Mental Health Research Scientist Awards; the American Association for Marriage and Family Therapy Distinguished Research Scientist Award,  the American Family Therapy Academy Award for Most Distinguished Contributor to Family Systems Research, the American Psychological Association Division of Family Psychology, Presidential Citation for Outstanding Lifetime Research Contribution and the National Council of Family Relations, 1994 Burgess Award for Outstanding Career in Theory and Research. In addition, Gottman takes a spot in the Psychotherapy Networker's Top 10 Most Influential Therapists of the past quarter-century.

In 2021, Gottman received an honorary Doctor of Science degree from the University of Wisconsin–Madison.

Works
Gottman has published over 190 papers, and is the author or co-author of 40 books, notably:

 
 
The Marriage Clinic (W.W. Norton, 1999), W W Norton page
 – a New York Times bestseller

 Gottman, John; Gottman, Julie Schwartz (2015). 10 Principles for Doing Effective Couples Therapy. New York: W.W. Norton & Company.

See also 
 Thin-slicing

References

External links 

 The Gottman Institute website
 The Mathematics of Love - An interview (Edge)
 An Interview with John Gottman (Psychotherapy.net)
 Gottman's Seven Principles For Making Marriage Work - Commentary from 50 Psychology Classics (2007)
 John Gottman: Raising an Emotionally Intelligent Child KUOW-FM Speaker Forum
 John Gottman : Couples workshop training first time in London United Kingdom in 2013

21st-century American psychologists
American psychology writers
American relationships and sexuality writers
Marriage
Divorce
American male non-fiction writers
American Orthodox Jews
American people of Austrian-Jewish descent
Jewish American writers
20th-century American non-fiction writers
21st-century American non-fiction writers
20th-century American male writers
21st-century American male writers
University of Washington faculty
1942 births
Living people
21st-century American Jews
20th-century American psychologists